Carolyn Dando (born about 1989) is an actress and singer from Auckland, New Zealand.

Dando's first role was in the TV film Fatal Contact: Bird Flu in America (2006).

Dando next appeared in Peter Jackson's feature film adaptation of The Lovely Bones (2009).

Early life
Dando was born in Auckland, New Zealand. As a young child she had a passion for music, not acting. At the age of 10 years she was picked to sing with Suzanne Prentice at a World Vision "Kids for Kids" Concert. The following year she gave a solo performance in front of several hundred schoolchildren and their parents at the annual regional school choir festival, with guests including the Mayor of Auckland City. She was encouraged by teachers to develop her talent, and began to study classical singing (as well as theory and piano) with the professional soprano Gina Sanders.

Career
Her first professional role was in Fatal Contact: Bird Flu in America, a made-for-television movie. But her big break came when she landed a part in The Lovely Bones. In 2010, she appeared on the show Shortland Street. In 2012 she appeared as Hailey in Girl vs. Boy.

Filmography

References

External links
 Carolyn's Trio – Atre

New Zealand film actresses
New Zealand television actresses
People from Auckland
1980s births
Living people
Date of birth missing (living people)
New Zealand soap opera actresses
21st-century New Zealand actresses